Tsʼilʔos Provincial Park is a provincial park in British Columbia, Canada. The "ʔ" in the name represents a glottal stop.

History
The park was established January 1994 after a five-year planning process was implemented to address long-standing conflicts between preservationist, resource extraction and First Nations interests.  After decades of controversy, a consensus was reached among various conservation, logging, mining, tourism and public participants.  Chief Roger William of the Xeni Gwet’in (Nemiah Indian Band) was very involved in the planning process and negotiations with the provincial government.  The park is part of the traditional territory of the Xeni Gwet’in. Tsʼilʔos, also known as Mount Tatlow, dominates the park and gives it its name, and is spiritually significant to the Xeni Gwet’in. According to tradition, Tsʼilʔos keeps watch over the people of the Xeni and their territory. Pointing at or climbing Tsʼilʔos are considered disrespectful, and the Xeni Gwet’in believe that doing so will offend Tsʼilʔos, resulting in severe weather changes.

Conservation
The park aims to protect black bear, mule deer, moose, mountain goat, cougar, and beaver. Ecologically sensitive animal populations found in the area include California bighorn sheep, grizzly bear, fisher, wolverine, bald eagle, and amphibian species.  Sockeye salmon spawn along the shores of Chilko Lake the centerpiece of the park.  The adjacent lands are also important habitat for Vaux's swift, Peregrine falcon, and Townsend's big-eared bat.

Recreation
The following recreational activities are encouraged: camping, picnicking, hiking, mountaineering, swimming, kayaking, horseback riding expeditions, hunting trips and flyfishing.

Location
Located 160 kilometres southwest of Williams Lake, or 250 km north of Vancouver, British Columbia.

Size
233,240 hectares in size.

References

External links

Tsʼilʔos Provincial Park
BC Geographical Names "Tsʼilʔos Park"

Provincial parks of British Columbia
Geography of the Chilcotin
Chilcotin Ranges